One Million A.D.   is a science fiction anthology edited by American writer Gardner Dozois, published in 2005.

The book may be the first anthology of stories focused on the far future.

Contents

The book includes 6 novellas, all commissioned for this book and published here for the first time. The stories are all supposed to take place in the year One Million A.D. The book also begins with a three-page introduction by Dozois entitled "Exploring the Far Future". The stories are as follows.

Robert Reed: "Good Mountain"
Robert Silverberg: "A Piece of the Great World"
Nancy Kress: "Mirror Image"
Alastair Reynolds: "Thousandth Night"
Charles Stross: "Missile Gap"
Greg Egan: "Riding the Crocodile"

The setting of Alastair Reynolds's story was later used as the setting for the novel House of Suns.

References

See also
Science Fiction Book Club original anthology series

2005 non-fiction books
Gardner Dozois anthologies
Science Fiction Book Club original anthologies
Dying Earth (genre)
Fiction set in the 7th millennium or beyond